Maskun may refer to:
 Monochromacy (in parts of Micronesia)
 Maskun, Iran, a village in Mazandaran Province, Iran
 Maskun Rural District, in Kerman Province, Iran